The 1924 Tennessee gubernatorial election was held on November 4, 1924. Incumbent Democrat Austin Peay defeated Republican nominee T. F. Peck with 57.20% of the vote.

Primary elections
Primary elections were held on August 7, 1924.

Democratic primary

Candidates
Austin Peay, incumbent Governor
John Randolph Neal Jr., attorney

Results

General election

Candidates
Austin Peay, Democratic
T. F. Peck, Republican

Results

References

1924
Tennessee
Gubernatorial